The Patience of the Spider (orig. Italian La pazienza del ragno) is a 2004 novel by Andrea Camilleri, translated into English in 2007 by Stephen Sartarelli. It is the eighth novel in the internationally popular Inspector Montalbano series.

Set once again in Sicily, The Patience of the Spider pits Inspector Montalbano against his greatest foe yet: the weight of his own years. Still recovering from the gunshot wound he suffered in Rounding the Mark, he must overcome self-imposed seclusion and waxing self-doubt to penetrate a web of hatred and secrets in pursuit of the strangest culprit he's ever hunted.

References

2004 Italian novels
Inspector Montalbano novels
Italian crime novels
Italian mystery novels
Novels set in Sicily
Picador (imprint) books